William III of Weimar (Wilhelmi Thuringorum praetor; died 16 April 1039) was count of Weimar from 1003 and of the Eichsfeld from 1022.

He was the youngest son of Count William II of Weimar.

Family 
 His first marriage was to Bertha.
 His second marriage was to Oda (probably the daughter of Thietmar, Margrave of the Saxon Ostmark). They had children:
 William IV (died  1062), Margrave of Meissen from 1046
 Otto I (died 1067), count of Orlamünde
 Poppo (died after 1046)
 Aribo (murdered 1070)

After his death, Oda married Dedi I, Margrave of Lusatia.

1039 deaths
Year of birth unknown
House of Weimar